The Armagh-Dublin rivalry is a Gaelic football rivalry between Irish county teams Armagh and Dublin, who first played each other in 1902. It is considered to be one of the most competitive rivalries in Gaelic games in the early part of the 21st century. Armagh's home ground is the Athletic Grounds and Dublin's home ground is Parnell Park, however, all of their championship meetings have been held at neutral venues, usually Croke Park.

While Dublin have the highest number of Leinster titles and Armagh are in third position on the roll of honour in Ulster, they have also enjoyed success in the All-Ireland Senior Football Championship, having won 29 championship titles between them to date.

All-time results

Legend

Senior

References

Dublin
Dublin county football team rivalries